Cocos Marine Conservation Area is an administrative area which is managed by SINAC for the purposes of conservation of Cocos Island, in the Pacific Ocean national waters of Costa Rica. 

This conservation area stretches from the south extreme point of Nicoya Peninsula towards Cocos Island, geographically as an island territory, it has pronounced topography, it is frequently cloudy and has copious amounts of rain year round. Cocos Island National Park and two marine management areas are within the ACMC.

There are 235 plant species, 400 of insects (65 endemic), 5 of reptiles (2 terrestrial endémic), 3 of marine turtles, 100 of birds (13 resident, 3 endemic), 50 arthropods (7 endemic), 57 of crustaceans, 600 of marine molluscs and 250 of fish. 

Among fish there are whitetip shark, hammerhead shark, yellowfin tuna, parrotfish, manta ray and jurel.

Protected areas
 Cocos Island National Park
 Submarine Mountains Marine Management Area, the waters surrounding the Cocos Island National Park area.

References 

Conservation Areas of Costa Rica